The Central Forensic Science Laboratory, Hyderabad (CFSL, Hyderabad), established in 1964 is one of the Seven Central Forensic Science Laboratories in India. The other laboratories are at Chandigarh, Kolkata, Bhopal, Pune and Guwahati. Since 2002, the laboratory is under the administrative control of the Directorate of Forensic Science Services, Ministry of Home Affairs (India), Government of India.

History
The laboratory, in the beginning started functioning from the Chirag Ali Lane in the Abids area of Hyderabad city. The laboratory shifted to its present location in Ramanthapur in 1982. The laboratory is situated in the vicinity of the Osmania University institutional area. Among other scientific examination facilities the laboratory provides the facilities for Explosives, Ballistics, Narcotics, Physics, Toxicology, Biology, Chemistry, Documents DNA examination and cyber forensics. Fingerprint verification is not done, however signature verification will be done. The first director of the CFSL Hyderabad was Dr. S.N.Garg. And now the present director is Sh Mahesh Chandra Joshi.

For detailed information, official website http://cfslhyd.gov.in/ may be viewed.

External links
 

Ministry of Home Affairs (India)
Research institutes in Hyderabad, India
Forensics organizations
Research institutes established in 1967
1967 establishments in Andhra Pradesh
Medical and health government agencies of India